Mathematics of apportionment describes mathematical principles and algorithms for fair allocation of identical items among parties with different entitlements. Such principles are used to apportion seats in parliaments among federal states or political parties. See apportionment (politics) for the more concrete principles and issues related to apportionment, and apportionment by country for practical methods used around the world.

Mathematically, an apportionment method is just a method of rounding fractions to integers. As simple as it may sound, each and every method for rounding suffers from one or more paradoxes. The mathematical theory of apportionment aims to decide what paradoxes can be avoided, or in other words, what properties can be expected from an apportionment method.

The mathematical theory of apportionment was studied as early as 1907 by the mathematician Agner Krarup Erlang. It was later developed to a great detail by the mathematician Michel Balinsky and the economist Peyton Young. Besides its application to political parties, it is also applicable to fair item allocation when agents have different entitlements. It is also relevant in manpower planning - where jobs should be allocated in proportion to characteristics of the labor pool, to statistics - where the reported rounded numbers of percentages should sum up to 100%, and to bankruptcy problems.

Definitions

Input 
The inputs to an apportionment method are:

 A positive integer  representing the total number of items to allocate. It is also called the house size, since in many cases, the items to allocate are seats in a house of representatives.
A positive integer  representing the number of agents to which items should be allocated. For example, these can be federal states or political parties.
These entitlements are often normalized such that .

Output 

In general, a "fair" apportionment is one in which each allocation  is as close as possible to the quota .

An apportionment method may return a set of apportionment vectors (in other words: it is a multivalued function). This is required, since in some cases there is no fair way to distinguish between two possible solutions. While such ties are extremely rare in practice, the theory must account for them (in practice, when an apportionment method returns multiple outputs, one of them may be chosen by some external priority rules, or by coin flipping, but this is beyond the scope of the mathematical apportionment theory).

Variants 
Sometimes, the input also contains a vector of integers  representing minimum requirements -  represents the smallest number of items that agent  should receive, regardless of its entitlement. So there is an additional requirement on the output:  for all .

When the agents are political parties, these numbers are usually 0, so this vector is omitted. But when the agents are states or districts, these numbers are often positive in order to ensure that all are represented. They can be the same for all agents (e.g. 1 for USA states, 2 for France districts), or different (e.g. in Canada or the European parliament).

Sometimes there is also a vector of maximum requirements, but it is less common.

Basic requirements 
There are basic properties that should be satisfied by any reasonable apportionment method. They were given different names by different authors: the names on the left are from Pukelsheim; The names in parentheses on the right are from Balinsky and Young.

 Anonymity (=Symmetry) means that the apportionment does not depend on the agents' names or indices.
This requirement makes sense when there are no minimal requirements, or when the requirements are the same; if they are not the same, then anonymity should hold subject to the requirements being satisfied.
Balancedness (=Balance) means that if two agents have equal entitlements, then their allocation should differ by at most 1:  implies .
Concordance (=Weak population monotonicity) means that an agent with a strictly higher entitlement receives at least as many items:  implies .
Decency (=Homogeneity) means that scaling the entitlement vector does not change the outcome. Formally,  for every constant c (this is automatically satisfied if the input to the apportionment method is normalized). 
Exactness (=Weak proportionality) means that if there exists a perfect solution, then it must be selected. Formally, if the quota  of each agent  is an integer number, then  must contain a unique vector .
Strong exactness means that exactness also holds "in the limit". To see the difference from weak exactness, consider the following rule. (a) Give each agent its quota rounded down, ; (b) give the remaining seats iteratively to the largest parties. This rule is weakly exact, but not strongly exact. For example, suppose h=6 and consider the sequence of quota vectors (4+1/k, 2-1/k). The above rule yields the allocation (5,1) for all k, even though the limit when k→∞ is the integer vector (4,2).  
Completeness means that, if some apportionment  is returned for a converging sequence of entitlement vectors, then  is also returned for their limit vector. An incomplete method can be "completed" by adding the apportionment  to any limit entitlement if and only if it belongs to every entitlement in the sequence. The completion of a symmetric and proportional apportionment method is complete, symmetric and proportional.
Completeness is violated by methods that apply an external tie-breaking rule, as done by many countries in practice. The tie-breaking rule applies only in the limit case, so it might break the completeness.
Completeness and weak-exactness together imply strong-exactness. If a complete and weakly-exact method is modified by adding an appropriate tie-breaking rule, then the resulting rule is no longer complete, but it is still strongly-exact.

Common apportionment methods 
There are many apportionment methods, and they can be classified into several approaches.

 Largest remainder methods start by computing the vector of quotas rounded down, that is, . If the sum of these rounded values is exactly , then this vector is returned as the unique apportionment. In this case, the remaining items are allocated among the agents according to their remainders : the agent with the largest remainder receives one seat, then the agent with the second-largest remainder receives one seat, and so on, until all items are allocated. There are several variants of the LR method, depending on which quota is used:
Using LR with the Hare quota leads to Hamilton's method.
The quotas in this method are larger, so there are fewer remaining items.
Formally, . Divisor methods differ by the method they use for rounding. A divisor method is parametrized by a divisor function  which specifies, for each integer , a real number in the interval . The number  itself can be rounded both up and down, so the rounding function is multi-valued. For example, Adams' method uses , which corresponds to rounding up; D'Hondt/Jefferson method uses , which corresponds to rounding down; and Webster/Sainte-Laguë method uses  , which corresponds to rounding to the nearest integer. A divisor method  can also be computed iteratively: initially,  is set to 0 for all parties. Then, at each iteration, the next seat is allocated to a party which maximizes the ratio  .
The apportionment is computed iteratively. Initially, set  to 0 for all parties. Then, at each iteration, allocate the next seat to an agent which maximizes  . Divisor methods are a special case of rank-index methods: a divisor method with divisor function  is equivalent to a rank-index method with rank-index  .
 Optimization-based methods aim to attain, for each instance, an allocation that is "as fair as possible" for this instance. An allocation is "fair" if   for all agents i; in this case, we say that the "unfairness" of the allocation is 0. If this equality is violated, one can define a measure of "total unfairness", and try to minimize it. One can minimize the sum of unfairness levels, or the maximum unfairness level. Each optimization criterion leads to a different rule.

Staying within the quota 

A basic requirement from an apportionment method is that it allocates to each agent  its quota  if it is an integer; otherwise, it should allocate it an integer that is near the exact quota, that is, either its lower quota  or its upper quota . We say that an apportionment method -

 Satisfies lower quota if  for all  (this holds iff ).
 Satisfies upper quota if  for all  (this holds iff ).
Satisfies both quotas if both the above conditions hold (this holds iff ).

Hamilton's largest-remainder method satisfies both lower quota and upper quota by construction. This does not hold for the divisor methods:

 All divisor methods satisfy both quotas when there are 2 agents;
Webster's method is the only divisor method satisfying both quotas for 3 agents;
Adams' method is the only divisor method satisfying upper quota for any number of agents;
 Jefferson's method is the only divisor method satisfying lower quota for any number of agents;
No divisor method simultaneously violates upper quota for one agent and violates lower quota for another agent.
Therefore, no divisor method satisfies both upper quota and lower quota for any number of agents. The uniqueness of Jefferson and Adams holds even in the much larger class of rank-index methods.

This can be seen as a disadvantage of divisor methods, but it can also be considered a disadvantage of the quota criterion:"For example, to give D 26 instead of 25 seats in Table 10.1 would mean taking a seat from one of the smaller states A, B, or C. Such a transfer would penalize the per capita representation of the small state much more - in both absolute and relative terms - than state D is penalized by getting one less than its lower quota. Similar examples can be invented in which some state might reasonably get more than its upper quota. It can be argued that staying within the quota is not really compatible with the idea of proportionality at all, since it allows a much greater variance in the per capita representation of smaller states than it does for larger states."In Monte-Carlo simulations, Webster's method satisfies both quotas with a very high probability. Moreover, any divisor method can be modified to satisfy both quotas. This yields the Quota-Webster method, Quota-Hill method, etc. This family of methods is often called the quatatone methods, as they satisfy both quotas and house-monotonicity.

Minimizing pairwise inequality 
One way to evaluate apportionment methods is by whether they minimize the amount of inequality between pairs of agents. Clearly, inequality should take into account the different entitlements: if  then the agents are treated "equally" (w.r.t. to their entitlements); otherwise, if  then agent  is favored, and if  then agent  is favored. However, since there are 16 ways to rearrange the equality , there are correspondingly many ways by which inequality can be defined.

 .
  for   This leads to Adams's method.
This leads to Jefferson's method.
 . This leads to Dean's method.
 . This leads to the Huntington-Hill method.
This analysis was done by Huntington in the 1920s. Some of the possibilities do not lead to a stable solution. There is an example with 3 states with populations (737,534,329) and 16 seats.

Bias towards large/small agents 

When the agents are federal states, it is particularly important to avoid bias between large states and small states. There are several ways to measure this bias formally. All measurements lead to the conclusion that Jefferson's method is biased in favor of large states, Adams' method is biased in favor of small states, and Webster's method is the least biased divisor method.

Consistency properties 
Consistency properties are properties that characterize an apportionment method, rather than a particular apportionment. Each consistency property compares the outcomes of a particular method on different inputs. Several such properties have been studied.

State-population monotonicity means that, if the entitlement of an agent increases, its apportionment should not decrease. The name comes from the setting where the agents are federal states, whose entitlements are determined by their population. A violation of this property is called the population paradox. There are several variants of this property. One variant - the pairwise PM - is satisfied exclusively by divisor methods. That is, an apportionment method is pairwise PM if-and-only-if it is a divisor method.

Combined with the previous statements, it implies that no divisor method satisfies both quotas.

House monotonicity means that, when the total number of seats  increases, no agent loses a seat. The violation of this property is called the Alabama paradox. It was considered particularly important in the early days of the USA, when the congress size increased every ten years. House-monotonicity is weaker than pairwise-PM. All rank-index methods (hence all divisor methods) are house-monotone - this clearly follows from the iterative procedure. Besides the divisor methods, there are other house-monotone methods, and some of them also satisfy both quotas. For example, the Quota method of Balinsky and Young satisfies house-monotonicity and upper-quota by construction, and it can be proved that it also satisfies lower-quota. It can be generalized: there is a general algorithm that yields all apportionment methods which are both house-monotone and satisfy both quotas. However, all these quota-based methods (Quota-Jefferson, Quota-Hill, etc.) may violate pairwise-PM: there are examples in which one agent gains in population but loses seats.

Uniformity (also called coherence) means that, if we take some subset of the agents , and apply the same method to their combined allocation , then the result is the vector . Moreover, every uniform method that is also anonymous and balanced must be a rank-index method.

Every uniform method that is also anonymous, weakly-exact and concordant (=  implies ) must be a divisor method. Moreover, among all anonymous methods:

 Jefferson's method is the only uniform method satisfying lower quota;
 Adams's method is the only uniform method satisfying upper quota;
 Webster's method is the only uniform method that is near quota;
 No uniform method satisfies both quotas. In particular, Hamilton's method and the Quota method are not uniform. However, the Quota method is the unique method that satisfies both quotas in addition to house-monotonicity and "quota-consistency", which is a weaker form of uniformity.

Encouraging coalitions 
When the agents are political parties, they often split or merge, and it is interesting to check how such splitting/merging affects the apportionment. Suppose a certain apportionment method gives two agents  some  seats respectively, and then these two agents form a coalition, and the method is re-activated.

 An apportionment method encourages coalitions if the coalition receives at least   seats (in other words, it is split-proof - a party cannot gain a seat by splitting).
 An apportionment method encourages schisms if the coalition receives at most   seats (in other words, it is merge-proof - two parties cannot gain a seat by merging).

Among the divisor methods:

 Jefferson's method is the unique divisor method that encourages coalitions;
 Adams's method is the unique divisor method that encourages schisms.
Webster's method is neither split-proof nor merge-proof, but it is "coalition neutral": when votes are distributed randomly, a coalition is equally likely to gain a seat than to lose a seat.
Since these are different methods, no divisor method gives every coalition of  exactly  seats. Moreover, this uniqueness can be extended to the much larger class of rank-index methods.

 The Hamilton method is coalitionally-stable.
 A divisor method with divisor  is coalitionally-stable iff ;  this holds for all five standard divisor methods.

Summary table

See also 

 Proportional representation
Multi-attribute proportional representation.
Apportionment when there are errors in the population counts.
Proportional cake-cutting with different entitlements
Fair item allocation

References 

Apportionment (politics)
Mathematical theorems
Apportionment method criteria